Yahia Gregni (born 10 February 1970) is a Libyan judoka. He competed in the men's half-middleweight event at the 1992 Summer Olympics.

References

1970 births
Living people
Libyan male judoka
Olympic judoka of Libya
Judoka at the 1992 Summer Olympics
Place of birth missing (living people)